Kennard Baker Bork (born October 13, 1940) is a retired university teacher of geology and geography from the United States. He graduated with a BA from DePauw University in 1962 then went on to collect an MA (1964) and a PhD (1967) from Indiana University. He ended a career stretching more than 35 years as Alumni Professor at Denison University in Granville, Ohio.

Awards
Bork has been honored not only for his solid record as an undergraduate geoscience teacher but also for his contributions to the study of the history and development of geology. In 1997 the Geological Society of America (GSA) awarded him the History of Geology Award, normally granted to scholars affiliated with much larger universities. And in 2000 Bork was awarded the Neil Miner Award for "contributions to the stimulation of interest in Earth Science" by the National Association of Geoscience Teachers. He is a Fellow of the GSA.

Publications
Bork's several dozen professional publications includes articles relating to sedimentology, stratigraphy, paleontology, historical geology and paleoecology. One of Bork's most notable academic accomplishments was the publication of the book Cracking Rocks and Defending Democracy (published by the American Association for the Advancement of Science in 1994) on geologist and social activist Kirtley F. Mather (1888-1978).

References

1940 births
Living people
20th-century American geologists
21st-century American geologists
DePauw University alumni
Indiana University alumni
Denison University faculty
Fellows of the Geological Society of America